Jinshi City is a county-level city in Hunan Province, China, it is under the administration of the prefecture-level city of Changde. It is divided into four towns and five subdistricts under its jurisdiction. The government seat is Xiangyangjie. Jinshi was honored as the National Sanitary City.

Administrative divisions
according to the result on adjustment of township-level administrative divisions of Jinshi City on November 23, 2015 Jinshi City has four towns and five subdistricts under its jurisdiction. they are:
4 towns
 Xinzhou, Jinshi
 Maolihu
 Yaoshan, Jinshi
 Baiyi

5 Subdistricts
 Sanzhouyi
 Wangjiaqiao
 Xiangyangjie
 Jinyuling
 Jiashan

References

External links

Government webportal of Jinshi

 
County-level divisions of Hunan
Changde